Guillermo Franco (born 21 May 1983 in Buenos Aires) is a retired Argentine football defender.

Football career

After playing for Los Andes and Defensa y Justicia, Franco joined Godoy Cruz in 2002. He played with the team in the Argentine Primera until 2009, when he dropped down a division to play for Independiente Rivadavia one season on loan. He returned to Godoy Cruz in 2010, but was immediately loaned to Atlético de Rafaela.

Outside football

In 2002, Franco became a member of the Church of Jesus Christ of Latter-day Saints (LDS Church). He resigned from Godoy Cruz in 2005 to serve as a Mormon missionary in the LDS Church's Argentina Mendoza Mission. In 2007, he returned from his mission and was brought back into the Godoy Cruz squad.

References
 Guillermo Franco – Argentine Primera statistics at Fútbol XXI  
 Guillermo Franco at BDFA.com.ar 
 team stats listing
 article in Spanish about Franco serving a mission
Church News, August 9, 2008.
 article about his being signed as a defender by Godoy Cruz

1983 births
Living people
Footballers from Buenos Aires
Argentine footballers
Association football defenders
Club Atlético Los Andes footballers
Defensa y Justicia footballers
Godoy Cruz Antonio Tomba footballers
Independiente Rivadavia footballers
Atlético de Rafaela footballers
Huracán de San Rafael players
Deportivo Maipú players
Deportivo Español footballers
Juventud Unida Universitario players
Argentine Primera División players
Primera Nacional players
Primera B Metropolitana players
Torneo Argentino A players
Torneo Argentino B players
Argentine Latter Day Saints
Argentine Mormon missionaries
Converts to Mormonism
Mormon missionaries in Argentina
21st-century Mormon missionaries